The 1971 CONMEBOL Pre-Olympic Tournament was the 4th CONMEBOL Pre-Olympic Tournament.

Brazil and Colombia qualified for the 1972 Summer Olympics.

Group stage

Group 1

Group 2

Final round

References 

CONMEBOL Pre-Olympic Tournament
1971 in association football
1971 in South American football